Buzyges is a genus of skippers in the family Hesperiidae.

Species
Recognised species in the genus Buzyges include:
 Buzyges idothea Godman, [1900]

Former species
Buzyges mellanaformis Austin & Warren, 2009 - transferred to Buzella mellanaformis (Austin & Warren, 2009)

References

Natural History Museum Lepidoptera genus database

Hesperiini
Hesperiidae genera